Thaisa Serafini (born February 14, 1985 in Caxias do Sul) is a professional squash player who represents the Brazil. She reached a career-high world ranking of World No. 56 in December 2012.

References

External links 
 
 
 

1985 births
Living people
Brazilian female squash players
South American Games silver medalists for Brazil
South American Games bronze medalists for Brazil
South American Games medalists in squash
Competitors at the 2010 South American Games
Squash players at the 2015 Pan American Games
Competitors at the 2013 World Games
Pan American Games competitors for Brazil